Speed Racer in My Most Dangerous Adventures is a 1994 racing video game developed by Radical Entertainment and published by Accolade for the Super Nintendo Entertainment System (Super NES).

Gameplay
This video game combines elements of racing and platform gaming. Speed has to take his trusty car, the Mach Five, to travel the world and win every grand prix there is. Infamous villains from the animated series are out there to capture Trixie, Speed's girlfriend, and he must stop them all. One of the first races takes place in New York City, with every race having at least eight drivers (including Speed).

Development and release
By the early 1990s, the Speed Racer anime had achieved a cult following in the United States due to twice-daily airings on MTV. This inspired Accolade to develop the DOS title Speed Racer in The Challenge of Racer X, and to further produce Speed Racer titles for the Super NES and Sega Genesis. When Accolade approached Radical Entertainment, the developer of Accolade's previous Pelé! and Brett Hull Hockey titles, they found that Radical had tried to license the game itself a year earlier; according to Radical producer Ian Verchere, "It was one of the first letters I wrote when we first started developing games". The Super NES and Genesis games were made in different genres to accommodate the difference in the consoles' capabilities. While the Genesis version would be a pure racing game, the Super NES game is more story-driven and features both driving and adventure levels as a closer reflection of the anime. Two distinct engines were designed for each level style, with the driving levels using Mode 7 technology for the creation of hills. Accolade producer Todd Thorson also cited the difference in audience between the consoles as a reason for creating different Speed Racer titles, stating that the Genesis's older audience would desire more racing action, while the Super NES's younger audience would be more accustomed to side-scrolling gameplay. Radical experienced little difficulty in capturing the anime's campy quality, and pointed out that having pre-existing settings and characters to work from made production easier.

Mark Slemko and Lennox Ong served as the game's programmers, while the graphics were created by Thom Bellaire, Yayoi Maruno, Rob Oliveira, Ryan Slemko, and Ian Verchere. The game was Marc Baril's debut work as a video game composer, having been a regular jamming partner of Radical's in-house audio programmer Paul Wilkinson. Baril was subsequently offered a full-time position at Radical, becoming the first dedicated audio creator to be hired by the company.

Reception
GamePro commented that the action, graphics, and controls on the racing segments are "second to none for challenging fun", while those of the action/adventure segments are consistently poor. They concluded the game is overall recommended for fans of the TV series.

Entertainment Weekly gave the game a C- and wrote that "Okay, so it's overexposed from MTV's recent heavy rotation. Still, Speed Racer In: My Most Dangerous Adventures is a blast for the nostalgia it's capable of provoking in baby boomers — a feeling those boomers won't get if they pick up this ho-hum adaptation of the hit cartoon. Accolade nails the campy, hardware-heavy Racer mystique just once, and that's in the manual, with detailed specs for the Mach 5's space age equipment. But the game's racing sequences are a big snooze — if it's G force you're after, there are three-year-old cartridges for the Super NES that go much, much faster."

References

Citations

Bibliography

External links
 Speed Racer in My Most Dangerous Adventures at MobyGames

1994 video games
Accolade (company) games
Cancelled Sega Genesis games
Multiplayer and single-player video games
North America-exclusive video games
Racing video games
Radical Entertainment games
My Most Dangerous Adventures
Super Nintendo Entertainment System games
Super Nintendo Entertainment System-only games
Video games developed in Canada
Video games scored by Marc Baril